New Rochester is an unincorporated community in Wood County, Ohio, United States.

History
New Rochester was originally called Freedom, and under the latter name was platted in 1835. A post office called New Rochester was established in 1837, and remained in operation until 1903. The present name may be derived from East Rochester, Ohio, the former home of an early settler.

References

Unincorporated communities in Wood County, Ohio
Unincorporated communities in Ohio